Nidia Guenard (born March 12, 1979) is an American retired professional wrestler. She is best known for winning the reality television series Tough Enough in 2001 and for her subsequent appearances with the World Wrestling Federation/World Wrestling Entertainment. She was with the company until 2004.

Professional wrestling career

World Wrestling Federation/Entertainment

Tough Enough (2001)
Guenard won a year's contract with the World Wrestling Federation (WWF) after she co-won the first season of Tough Enough, a show meant both to be a "WWF Superstar" talent search, and a semi-documentary of the difficulties of being a trainee professional wrestler.

Ohio Valley Wrestling (2001–2002)
Guenard made a few appearances on WWF episodes in 2001 before being sent to the Ohio Valley Wrestling (OVW) promotion, with whom WWE had a talent-development agreement. While in OVW she feuded with Victoria.

SmackDown! (2002–2004)
Guenard debuted on the SmackDown! brand on the June 6, 2002 episode, in a backstage segment with The Hurricane (who was her on-screen ex-boyfriend) and Jamie Noble. Noble and Guenard then became an on-screen couple in a "trailer trash" gimmick. They were both playing as heels, with Nidia leading Noble to several wins, due to interference during the matches. At the King of the Ring she led Noble to winning the Cruiserweight Championship from The Hurricane. She then began to feud with SmackDown! Diva Torrie Wilson leading to many solo and mixed tag team matches with Guenard and Noble against Wilson and various other cruiserweights, including Funaki, Billy Kidman, Rey Mysterio, and Brian Kendrick.

On the October 16, 2003 episode of SmackDown! Guenard was blinded by Tajiri during a match between Tajiri and Noble, after which Tajiri spewed his "Black mist" onto her face (this version of the mist was only ever seen in this instance). Storyline-wise, this encounter resulted in a physical 'injury' to Guenard. After recovering, Guenard started appearing at ringside with sunglasses on, to 'sell' the after effects of her injuries. During this time, Noble would throw Guenard in front of various opponents at a match's climax, to both save himself and let him later accuse them of "hitting a woman", etc. Later in this storyline, Rey Mysterio revealed to Guenard that Noble was exploiting her in the aforementioned manner, resulting in Guenard turning against Noble and becoming a fan favorite in the process. The two feuded, culminating in a match at No Way Out in which Noble had to wear a blindfold. True to character, Noble cheated to win as he removed his blindfold during the match.

Raw (2004)
Guenard was drafted to the Raw Brand on March 22, 2004. She became a face and claimed to be excited that she was drafted to Raw, where she can compete for the WWE Women's Championship. She made her debut match on the March 29, 2004 episode of Raw, defeating Molly Holly. She then tag teamed regularly  with Stacy Keibler and Victoria against heels Trish Stratus, Gail Kim, Molly Holly and Jazz. With the shift to Raw also came a change in character, as Guenard's Hispanic heritage was played up; to this effect, she was no longer billed as being from the South but instead she was billed as being from Puerto Rico and she no longer spoke English during promos, instead speaking Spanish in a quick and angry fashion. Guenard was released from her WWE contract on November 3, 2004 along with several other performers, in a routine purge of talent.

Independent circuit 
Guenard worked several wrestling matches post-WWE, including versus Gail Kim for Mexico's Toryumon and for Australia's World Series Wrestling. In addition, she worked for TNA overseas "a few times." In a ClubWWI.com interview, she said they were fun to work for, but she liked her freedom from wrestling, in general. She also wrestled for Northeast Wrestling (NWE), where she feuded with Jackie Gayda.

In 2016, she made a rare appearance at the WWE Hall of Fame ceremony.

Personal life
Guenard and her husband David Krichmar have two children.

Guenard is a vegetarian. In February 2010, she began training at the Culinary Institute Lenôtre in Houston, Texas.

Championships and accomplishments 
World Wrestling Federation
Tough Enough I - with Maven Huffman

References

External links 
 
 

1979 births
Living people
Professional wrestlers from Texas
Professional wrestling managers and valets
Puerto Rican female professional wrestlers
Tough Enough contestants
21st-century American women
21st-century professional wrestlers